Venetian sauce (French: Sauce vénitienne) is a classical French herb sauce used to accompany fish. It consists of:

 a velouté and fish fumet base
 equal quantities of tarragon vinegar and white wine reduced with:
 chopped shallots and chervil
 White wine sauce
 Herb juice

After cooking, it is strained and finished with chopped chervil and tarragon.

See also

 List of sauces

References

French sauces